Enrico Francesco Leopoldo "Enrique" Ferrarese (July 3, 1882January 1, 1968) was an Italian Argentine real estate developer.

Professional life 
Born in Cerea, Italy in 1882, arrived in Argentina at age 2 with his father, Giuseppe Angelo, and his mother, Luigia Martini, who renamed him Enrique Ferrarese. He married Ana Carrasco González (1888–1924), with whom he fathered four children: Enrique, Blanca, Ali, and Noemí. Enrique founded the construction firm Ferrarese Hermanos & Cia. with his brother Guido. The firm began working mostly on façades, plaster details and ornamental finishing on other major projects such as the Bola de nieve (snowball) a large spherical structure on top of a building located in the intersection of Córdoba and Laprida. The warehouse of Ferrarese Hermanos & Cia. was located at 1251 Callao Street.

The Bola de nieve building stands today as one of the architectural landmarks of Rosario. Soon thereafter Ferrarese Hermanos & Cia. went on to build family homes and a series of retail service stations for the Dutch oil company, Shell. One of the first major works was the construction of another iconic building in Rosario, the one known as the Palacio "La Rosario", which will later become the birthplace of the legendary guerrilla warrior Ernesto Guevara, aka Che Guevara. "La Rosario", is situated at the intersection of Urquiza and Entre Rios. Next in line came the Palacio Fuentes, A recognizable landmark and one of the first skyscrapers in South America.
Other projects carried by Ferrarese Hermanos & Cia. were the "Club Rosarino de Pelota", the "Barrio Fisherton Golf Club", the tribune of "Newell's Old Boys" stadium in Parque de la Independencia, and the building commissioned by Countess of Chateaubriand in Buenos Aires. Enrique Ferrarese died in Rosario on January 1, 1968.

Gallery

References 

1882 births
1968 deaths
People from the Province of Verona
Argentine agnostics
20th-century Argentine businesspeople
Businesspeople in construction
Italian emigrants to Argentina
People from Rosario, Santa Fe